Khanjin (also Romanized as Khānjīn, Khānejīn, and Khān Jīn; also known as Khakadzhin and Khānaji) is a village in Golabar Rural District, in the Central District of Ijrud County, Zanjan Province, Iran. At the 2006 census, its population was 396, in 113 families.

References 

Populated places in Ijrud County